West End School is a historic school building located at Henderson, Vance County, North Carolina.  It was built in 1922, and is a two-story, 10 bay wide, red brick school.  An addition was built about 1960, and is connected to the main school building by a 1 1/2-story hyphen.  In 2003 the building was converted into 11 apartment units for the elderly.

It was listed on the National Register of Historic Places in 2005.

References

 

School buildings on the National Register of Historic Places in North Carolina
School buildings completed in 1922
Buildings and structures in Vance County, North Carolina
National Register of Historic Places in Vance County, North Carolina
1922 establishments in North Carolina